The Lakeview Local School District is located in Cortland, in Trumbull County, Northeastern Ohio, a suburban community with a population of about 13,500. The School District oversees one high school and a K-8. It is serviced by the Trumbull County Educational Service Center.

Schools
Lakeview High School
Lakeview Middle School
Lakeview Elementary

References

External links
Lakeview Local Schools

School districts in Ohio
Education in Trumbull County, Ohio